Marsel Rushani (born 8 October 1986) is an Albanian football player.

External links
 Profile - FSHF
 

1986 births
Living people
Sportspeople from Fier
Albanian footballers
Association football midfielders
KS Shkumbini Peqin players
KF Apolonia Fier players
Luftëtari Gjirokastër players
KF Himara players
Kategoria Superiore players
Kategoria e Parë players